Konstantin Sellheim (born 1978) is a German classical violist, who has appeared internationally with a focus on chamber music. He is a violist of the Münchner Philharmoniker, and lecturer of viola at the Universität der Künste Berlin.

Career 
Sellheim began to play violin at age six. He studied violin at the Hochschule für Musik und Theater Hannover. He was from 2004 violist with the Staatskapelle Berlin conducted by Daniel Barenboim, and from 2006 violist of the Münchner Philharmoniker.

He has played with his sister, the pianist Katharina Sellheim, as the Duo Sellheim. They recorded a CD, Fantasy, of works by Robert Schumann, Paul Hindemith and Rebecca Clarke. With the clarinetist László Kuti, they have performed as the Sellheim-Kuti-Trio. The trio recorded a CD, Märchenerzählungen (Fairy tales), including Mozart's Kegelstatt Trio, K. 498, Schumann's Märchenerzählungen, Op. 132, György Kurtág's Hommage a R. Sch., Op. 15d, Prokofiev's Overture on Hebrew Themes, Op. 34, and Greetings from the Balkan by Béla Kovács. Sellheim also played chamber music with Giora Feidman, Igor Levit and Michael Schade, among others.

Sellheim created new music, playing for example in 2014 in a concert at the Gasteig in Munich the premiere of the piano quartet Skylla and Charybdis by Graham Waterhouse, along with the composer's Sonata ebraica and Beethoven's Piano Quartet in C major, WoO 36/3, with his sister, the violinist David Frühwirth and the composer.

He has been lecturer of viola at the Universität der Künste Berlin in Rohde's class.

References

External links 
 Artist of the Week – Konstantin Sellheim (interview) public-republic.de 24 Oktober 2012
 

German violists
1978 births
Living people
21st-century violists
21st-century German musicians
21st-century German male musicians
Hochschule für Musik, Theater und Medien Hannover alumni
Berlin University of the Arts alumni
Academic staff of the Berlin University of the Arts